Georgios Fotakis (born 29 October 1981) is a Greek former professional footballer who played as a midfielder.

He last played for Panachaiki.

Club career
Fotakis spent his early career in his native Greece, playing for PAOK, Kallithea and Egaleo. He moved to Scotland in January 2006 to sign for Kilmarnock, but he never made a league appearance for them. He then returned to Greece in 2006 with Larissa, before moving to PAOK in the summer of 2009. He played with PAOK for four consecutive years, before he moved for a 1+1 year contract to Şanlıurfaspor. At 31 January 2014 he signed with Atromitos a one and a half year contract. On 27 May 2014 Atromitos announced the end of cooperation with Fotakis. On 31 August 2015 Fotakis signed with Panetolikos for a year contract. On 25 June 2015, Fotakis made an oral agreement with the Greek club Veria, but never signed a contract and remained without a team in the first round of the season. On 5 February 2016, Super League club Panthrakikos officially announced the signing of Fotakis until the end of the season.
On 8 August 2016, Fotakis has signed a contract with Gamma Ethniki club Panachaiki.

International career
Fotakis has played for the Greek under-21 side, and also made three appearances in the 2004 Summer Olympics.

Fotakis made his international debut for the Greek senior team in 2009.

Honours
AEL
 Greek Cup: 2006–07

References

1981 births
Living people
Footballers from Kalamata
Greek footballers
Greece international footballers
Greece youth international footballers
Olympic footballers of Greece
Footballers at the 2004 Summer Olympics
UEFA Euro 2012 players
Expatriate footballers in Scotland
Expatriate footballers in Turkey
Greek expatriate footballers
Greek expatriate sportspeople in Turkey
Super League Greece players
PAOK FC players
Egaleo F.C. players
Kallithea F.C. players
Kilmarnock F.C. players
Athlitiki Enosi Larissa F.C. players
Şanlıurfaspor footballers
TFF First League players
Atromitos F.C. players
Veria F.C. players
Panetolikos F.C. players
Association football midfielders